Harry Gladstone Clarke (1 June 1881 – 8 April 1956) was a Canadian parliamentarian and insurance agent.

Clarke was an alderman on Toronto City Council for Ward 2, when he was elected to the House of Commons of Canada in the 1935 federal election as the Conservative Member of Parliament for Rosedale. He was defeated in the summer of 1939 in his attempt to win the nomination as a National Conservative candidate in the 1940 federal election by Harry Jackman. After he and his supporters unsuccessfully tried to obtain an "open convention" in Rosedale in early 1940 to re-contest the nomination, he retired from politics.

He died en route to Florida at Pennsylvania in 1956. He was interred at Mount Pleasant Cemetery.

References

 

1881 births
Members of the House of Commons of Canada from Ontario
Toronto city councillors
Conservative Party of Canada (1867–1942) MPs
1956 deaths